Daniel Webster Comstock (December 16, 1840 – May 19, 1917) was an American lawyer, jurist, and Civil War veteran who briefly served as a U.S. representative from Indiana in 1917.

Biography 
Born in Germantown, Ohio, Comstock attended the common schools, and was graduated from the Ohio Wesleyan University, Delaware, Ohio, in 1860.
He studied law.
He was admitted to the bar in 1861 and commenced practice in New Castle, Indiana.
He served as district attorney in 1862.

Civil War 
During the Civil War he enlisted in the Ninth Indiana Cavalry and was successively promoted to regimental sergeant major, first lieutenant, captain, and acting assistant adjutant general in the military division of Mississippi.

Career
He settled in Richmond, Indiana, in 1866 and became a city attorney in that year. He served as prosecuting attorney of the Wayne circuit court from 1872–1874.
He served as member of the state senate in 1878. He served as judge of the seventeenth judicial circuit from 1886–1895. He served as judge of the appellate court from 1896–1911 after which he resumed the practice of law.

Congress 
Comstock was elected as a Republican to the Sixty-fifth Congress and served from March 4, 1917, until his death.

Death
After serving less than three months in office, he died in Washington, D.C., on May 19, 1917.
He was interred in Earlham Cemetery, Richmond, Indiana.

See also
List of United States Congress members who died in office (1900–49)

References

External links 
 
 
 Daniel W. Comstock, late a representative from Indiana, Memorial addresses delivered in the House of Representatives and Senate frontispiece 1919

1840 births
1917 deaths
People of Indiana in the American Civil War
Indiana state court judges
Republican Party Indiana state senators
People from Richmond, Indiana
Burials at Earlham Cemetery, Richmond, Indiana
Ohio Wesleyan University alumni
Union Army officers
19th-century American politicians
People from Germantown, Ohio
19th-century American judges
Republican Party members of the United States House of Representatives from Indiana